Viva La Dirt League or VLDL is a New Zealand group of professional sketch comedy YouTubers. The founding members are Rowan Bettjeman, Alan Morrison and Adam King, but their productions have featured other regular cast members such as Byron Coll, Hamish Parkinson, Adrian Williamson, David Correos, Britt Scott Clark, Ben Van Lier, Ellie Harwood, and Robert Hartley.

, their YouTube channel has 4.74 million subscribers, and over 1.644 billion views. Their second YouTube channel, Viva La Dirt League D&D, has 322 thousand subscribers, and over 29.8 million views. They have a Spanish language channel, launched in July 2022, which has 3.67 thousand subscribers and over 296 thousand views.

Background
Before forming VLDL, Bettjeman and Morrison's short Beached was selected for showing at the New Zealand International Film Festival in 2010. Bettjeman and Morrison present a weekly news media online clip show "Media Ocre Awards" for the WatchMe.co.nz. The group went full-time in 2017.

The group's sketches have been nominated for Streamy Awards. Fans of the group include English actor Andrew Koji. The group is represented by Creative Artists Agency.

Series

PUBG Logic
PUBG Logic is set in an online multiplayer battle royale game (ostensibly PlayerUnknown's Battlegrounds). Characters are players' avatars and the comedy focuses on the bugs, gameplay limitations, and exploits in the game. Use of the PUBG imagery has been endorsed by the game's creators, and due to the popularity of the game, and the group's sketches, they have attended gaming conventions (Armageddon) and tournaments (League of Legends Pro League) to promote these characters. A supercut of the first season has reached over 17 million views on YouTube.

Epic NPC Man
Epic NPC Man is a sketch comedy set within "Skycraft", an entirely fictional fantasy MMORPG where non-playing characters (NPCs) and players interact. The series deconstructs the logic of RPGs, the mechanics of video games and the fantasy genre at large, typically spoofing real-life game franchises such as The Elder Scrolls, World of Warcraft, Dark Souls and The Witcher. Initially, Epic NPC Man was presented almost exclusively from the perspective of Greg (Morrison), a lowly NPC garlic farmer and quest-giver in the tranquil but unremarkable village of Honeywood in the nation of Azerim. Other recurring characters include the blacksmith Bodger (Bettjeman) and the sorcerer Baradün (King). Many scenes have been filmed at Howick Historical Village.

Baelin's Route: An Epic NPC Man Adventure
In 2020, the group crowdfunded NZ$660,000 (c. €390,000) via Kickstarter to produce a short film set in the Epic NPC Man universe. Baelin's Route: An Epic NPC Man Adventure premiered on YouTube on 9 May 2021. The film, which was written by Morrison and directed by Morrison and King, stars Bettjeman as Baelin, a non-player character whose normal route, from home to fishing spot, is interrupted by a human player (Ben Van Lier) and a damsel in distress (Phoenix Cross) making him into a reluctant hero. It had over 900 thousand views within 24 hours of its release.

Bored
Bored is a series of sketches primarily based in a computer store. New Zealand Radio Award-winning presenter Ellie Harwood co-stars as an employee. Although it is filmed inside a PlayTech store, which is a real company set in New Zealand, the sketches are independent from the company.

Viva La Dirt League D&D
Starting in July 2019, Viva released a short Dungeons and Dragons series where their Epic NPC Man characters adventured into Baldur's Gate: Descent into Avernus, with Robert Hartley as Dungeon Master. Building on its success, in March 2020, Viva launched their second YouTube channel focusing on Dungeons and Dragons content set in the Epic NPC Man universe. King, Morrison and Bettjeman reprise their roles as Greg, Baradun and Bodger and Van Lier debuts the character Bob in the campaign.

Studio
A Kickstarter campaign for a filming studio and office space for the company raised over US$2.5 Million in March 2022, with a location to be determined.  In August, the Kickstarter campaign page (Update #38) and the VLDL YouTube channel updated with the news of the new studio location having been secured after a long search.  The video shows a tour of the new, unrenovated facilities.

References

External links
 
 

Comedy YouTubers
English-language YouTube channels
Gaming YouTubers
New Zealand comedy troupes
New Zealand television producers
New Zealand YouTubers
People from Auckland
Works based on Dungeons & Dragons
YouTube channels launched in 2011
YouTube filmmakers
Comedy-related YouTube channels